First Programme (Proto Programma) is the first Greek public radio station, first broadcast by the National Radio Foundation and later Hellenic Broadcasting Corporation.

1938
Founded in 1938 as Athens Radio Station from a studio in Zappeion, with transponders in Ano Liosia and the musical branding "Tsopanakos" (I was a shepherd) by clarinetist Nikos Rellia, from Goura, Corinthia.

1945
When Germany invaded, it stopped transmitting, returning in 1945 with a new name, as radio EIR. To station's program was mainly music, and in between, there was news. Since the beginning of the station had a significant presence and theater, with the participation of important artists such as Alexis Solomos and Karolos Koun while in theater of Sartre in 1951 made his radio debut Manos Hadjidakis writing music of investment.

1952
In 1952, the modernization of radio and to stand out from the newly created second program the radio station of the former National Institute of maintaining the informative orientation evolved in First Schedule.

1978
In 1978, the National Radio and TV Broadcasting Foundation (EIRT) was reorganized into a public limited company and renamed Hellenic Broadcasting Corporation and the first program continued to operate under the new entity.

The station was founded under the name "First Program" in 1978. It was the first program that operated as public radio, The Hellenic Broadcasting Corporation (ERT) was reorganized as a public limited company. The station continued operating as part of the new entity.

1987
In 1987 due to the restructuring of the Hellenic Radio, programs were renamed to ERA 1.

1997
In 1997, during another reorganization and consolidation of the television, NET (formerly ET2) again changed its denomination to NET 105.8, which later became "First Program" with news. The station got into the information radio market and had great success. The station went so in the competitive field of information broadcasting, but has great success. In 1997, under a new reorganization and consolidation of the NET changed once again called in NET 105.8, which later synetmise in NET FM, and had informative.

2012
In December 2012, it returned to its former name, but kept its programming. In December 2012 he returned to his former name, but tainted with the informative character.

2013
On June 11, 2013, the government decided to close the ERT. However, after ERT closed, the ERA 1 and some other stations owned by ERT are still remain online, controlled by then-former ERT employees via ERT Open. The name "First Program" continues to be used by the first radio station under the new state broadcaster, NERIT.

2015
On June 11, 2015, the First programme was reopened.

Petridis and Zougris
Giannis Petridis and Kostas Zougris had a radio show, 1974—2012, for 38 years.

References

Hellenic Radio
Radio stations established in 1939
1939 establishments in Greece
Propaganda radio broadcasts
News and talk radio stations